Alison Criscitiello is an ice core scientist, National Geographic Explorer, Fellow of the Royal Canadian Geographical Society, and Director of the Canadian Ice Core Lab at the University of Alberta. In addition to her academic work, she is a co-founder of Girls on Ice Canada and an avid adventurer and mountain climber. She led the first all-women ascent of Lingsarmo (formerly known as Pinnacle Peak) and has received numerous American Alpine Club grants for her pioneering expeditions.

Early life and education 
Criscitiello grew up in Winchester, Massachusetts, and is a former U.S. Climbing Ranger (Olympic and North Cascades National Parks). She has two sisters, one of whom is her identical twin. She holds a B.A. in Earth and Environmental Science from Wesleyan University (2003), an M.A. in Geology and Geophysics from Columbia University (2006), and a Ph.D. in Glaciology from the Massachusetts Institute of Technology (2014). Hers is the first Ph.D. in Glaciology conferred by M.I.T.

Career 
After completing her Ph.D., Criscitiello accepted a Post-Doctoral Fellowship in the Department of Geography at the University of Calgary, and has been an Adjunct Assistant Professor there since 2016. She became the Director of the Ice Core Laboratory at the University of Alberta in 2017. Using ice cores from the polar regions, her research helps explain how ocean conditions impact coastal ice caps and ice sheets, and how global atmospheric teleconnections drive such variability at the poles. Newer projects involving drilling ice cores in non-polar regions contribute to a deeper understanding of climate variability as well as human impacts on remote landscapes.

Criscitiello is the Canadian national delegate to the International Partnerships in Ice Core Science, and is a member of their Steering Committee.

She is a co-founder of Girls on Ice Canada.

Selected expeditions 
Criscitiello has been adventuring since childhood, and is an experienced mountaineering guide and expedition leader.

 2021 Mount Logan
2017 Dawson to Tuktayaktuk Arctic Bike
2016 Borderski
2010 Lingsarmo

Awards and recognition 
2020 National Geographic Explorer

2018 Best Mountaineering Article Award (Banff Mountain Book Competition)

2017 American Alpine Club Research Grant recipient

2016 Mugs Stump Award

2015 John Lauchlan Award

2015 Lara-Karena Bitenieks Kellogg and Scott Fischer Memorial Conservation Grant

Selected works

References

External links 
Girls on Ice Canada

Living people
Women glaciologists
Massachusetts Institute of Technology alumni
1981 births
Royal Canadian Geographical Society fellows